The Underpants is the most recent adaptation of the 1910 German farce Die Hose by the playwright Carl Sternheim.  The adaptation was written by Steve Martin. It was produced at New York City's Off-Broadway theater Classic Stage Company from April 4, 2002 through April 28, 2002. The play, a "farcical send-up of bourgeois snobbery and conformity" was directed by Barry Edelstein and featured Cheryl Lynn Bowers and Byron Jennings as Louise and Theo Maske.

Other productions 

The play has been produced at the Geffen Playhouse in Los Angeles (March - April 2004) and at the Arden Theatre in Philadelphia (September - October 2004. More recent productions include:
 Brüka Theatre (Reno, Nevada), November 11, 2005 - February 4, 2006, directed by Brian Barney.
 Showcase Theatre, Exeter, Pa. 2005
 Alley_Theatre, Houston, April 1–24, 2005 
 The Old Red Lion, Islington, London, UK, October 24 - November 18, 2006, directed by Richard Braine
 University of Northern Iowa, Cedar Falls, Iowa, June 6–8, 2008, directed by Jay Edelnant 
 Langhorne Players, Newtown, PA, April 17 - May 2, 2009, directed by Alice Weber
University of Adelaide Theatre Guild, Adelaide, Australia, May 9–23, 2009 directed by John Wells
First Presbyterian Theater, Fort Wayne, Indiana, June 4–20, 2009, directed by Joel D. Scribner
Princeton Summer Theater, Princeton, New Jersey, August 6–16, 2009, directed by Shawn Fennell
 Rockford College, Artists' Ensemble Theatre, Rockford, Illinois, September 9–26, 2011, directed by Richard Raether
Shore School Drama Studio, Sydney, Australia, November 18–21, 2009, directed by Rachel Blake
The University of Scranton Players - December 3–6, 2009
The University of Mississippi, Oxford, Mississippi, USA, February 16–21, 2009, directed by Rory Ledbetter.
Dearborn Heights Civic Theater, Dearborn Heights, Michigan- February 20–22 + 26-27 2010, directed by Cynthia Frabutt http://www.dhctstage.org/
Penobscot Theatre Company, Bangor, Maine, USA, May 26 - June 30, 2010, directed by Nathan Halvorson 
The Richard Stockton College of New Jersey, Galloway Township, New Jersey—November 17–20, 2010, directed by Pamela Hendrick
Chung Ying Theatre Company, Hong Kong, April 1–10, 2011, directed by Gabriel Lee http://www.chungying.com
Salem State University, Salem, Massachusetts—Spring 2011, directed by Britt Mitchell, assistant directed by Emily Laverdiere and Kevin Murphy Walunas
Pentacle Theatre, Salem, Oregon, July 15-August 6, 2011, directed by Jenni Bertels 
National Institute of Dramatic Art, Sydney, Australia, 22 - 25, 27 June 2011, directed by Craig Ilott  
McPherson College, McPherson, Kansas, October 2011, directed by Jd. Bowman 
Waterloo Community Playhouse, Waterloo, Iowa, May 11-19, 2012, directed by Charles Stilwill
Los Medanos College, Pittsburg, California, March, 6 - 9, 11, 13 - 15, 2013, directed by Nick Garcia 
Florida Studio Theatre, Sarasota, Florida, June 26 - July 28, 2013, directed by Bruce Jordan 
Epic Shit Entertainment, New Delhi, India, February 14–24, 2013, adapted and directed by Madhav Mehta 
Hartford Stage, Hartford, Connecticut, January 9 - February 9, 2014, directed by Gordon Edelstein
Syracuse Stage, Syracuse, New York, October 21 - November 8, 2015, directed by Bill Fennelly 
The Collective Face Theatre Ensemble, Savannah, Georgia, December 4–20, 2015 
Acrosstown Repertory Theatre, Gainesville, Florida, June 3–19, 2016, directed by Jessica Arnold.
Fauquier Community Theater, Warrenton, VA, January 27-February 12, 2017, directed by Scott J. Strasbaugh.
American Repertory Theater of Western New York, Buffalo, NY, March 9 - April 1, 2017, directed by Jeff Coyle.
The University of Wisconsin, Madison, WI, April 13-April 30, 2017, directed by Scott Cummins.
Armstrong State University, Savannah, GA, July 13–16, 2017, Masquers Performance Directed by Geoffrey Douglas
Temple University, Philadelphia, PA, December 2017
Murray State University, Murray, KY, April 25–28, 2019, directed by Matthew Crider 
Bergen County Players, Oradell, NJ, May 14-22, 2022

References 

 
 Die Hose at Deutsch Wikipedia (German language)
 Seaside Repertory Theatre's 2007 Production
 Description and reviews of performance by BareBones Theatre Group
 2006 London Production at Old Red Lion
 2008 Germantown Community Theatre Production
 Google Books page for The Underpants
 Florida Studio Theatre's 2013 production of The Underpants

Plays by Steve Martin
2002 plays